was a daimyō during the Edo period of Japan. He was the sixth son of Tokugawa Ieyasu. He was born in Edo Castle during the year of the dragon (tatsu), and as a child his name was Tatsuchiyo (辰千代). Ieyasu sent the boy to live with a vassal, Minagawa Hiroteru, daimyō of the Minagawa Domain in Shimotsuke Province.

Biography
In 1599, Ieyasu granted him a fief in Musashi Province, and increased his holdings in 1602 and 1603 with transfers first to Shimōsa and then to Shinano Provinces. Tadateru married Irohahime, the first daughter of Date Masamune, in 1606. In 1610, Tadateru became daimyo of Takada in Echigo Province. He had interests in martial arts, tea, and foreign intercourse. It is said that he was baptized a Christian.

Ieyasu regarded Masamune as a dangerous being. Therefore, Tadateru was treated coldly by the shogunate. He was assigned to remain in Edo during the Winter Campaign of the Siege of Osaka (1614). He participated in the Summer Campaign (1615), but due to his insubordination during the latter stages of the campaign (perceived not only as defiance of his older brother, the then shōgun Tokugawa Hidetada, but also of their father Ieyasu), he was relieved of command and exiled to Ise, then Hida, and finally Shinano Province, where he remained until his death.

Tadateru was posthumously pardoned in 1984 by Tokugawa Tsunenari, the head of the former shogunal house.

In popular culture
A 1987 television show Dokuganryū Masamune starring Hiroyuki Sanada dramatized the life of Matsudaira Tadateru.

Shinichi Chiba played Matsudaira Tadateru in the 1992 TV series Tokugawa Buraichō (徳川無頼帳).

Family
 Father: Tokugawa Ieyasu
 Mother: Lady Chaa
 Adopted Father: Matsudaira Yasutada (1546–1618)
 Wife: Irohahime
 Concubine: Otake no Kata
 Children:
 Tokumatsu (1614-1632) by Otake
 Gotakehime (1615-1621) by Otake

References

External links
Matsudaira Tadateru Suwa City Web site (in Japanese)

|-

|-

|-

1592 births
1683 deaths
Daimyo
Nagasawa-Matsudaira clan
Tokugawa clan